Vermillion Lies were a cabaret band from Oakland, California. The band consisted of siblings Kim Boekbinder and Zoe Boekbinder. They are known for incorporating elements of circus and folk into their music. The band stated on their website on August 7, 2009: "Our exciting news today is that Vermillion Lies is giving way to two solo careers!  We will still be playing some shows together as Vermillion Lies, but most of our energies and attentions will be going to our solo music at this time."

Discography

Studio albums
 Separated by Birth (2006), Label: A Small Tribe Records, ASIN: B000HD1MZW
 What's in the Box? (2008), MP3, self-released, ASIN: B001BL2JFQ

EPs
 Scream-Along EP (2007)
 In New Orleans 7" vinyl (2008)

References 

Artist spotlight: Vermillion Lies, December 14, 2008, ReGenMagazine
'Twisted' Sisters; Vermillion Lies brings originality and spunk to something like folk music., Monterey County Weekly, May 12, 2005
"Top ten reasons we love Vermillion Lies.", Curve, November 1, 2007

External links 
 
 Official blog
 Vermillion Lies on MySpace
 Vermillion Lies on Bandcamp
 Vermillion Lies on Last.fm
  Kim Boekbinder's website
  Zoe Boekbinder's website

Musical groups from Oakland, California
Dark cabaret musicians
Rock music duos
Musical groups established in 2006